The 34th General Assembly of Nova Scotia represented Nova Scotia between 1906 and 1911.

The Liberal Party led by George Henry Murray formed the government.

Edward Matthew Farrell was named speaker.

The assembly was dissolved on May 15, 1911.

List of Members 

Notes:

References 
 

Terms of the General Assembly of Nova Scotia
1906 establishments in Nova Scotia
1911 disestablishments in Nova Scotia
20th century in Nova Scotia